A special election was held in  on November 6, 1826 to fill a vacancy caused by the death of James Johnson (Jacksonian) on August 14, 1826.

Election results

Details

Result 

McHatton took his seat on December 7, 1826.

See also
List of special elections to the United States House of Representatives

References

 

Kentucky 1826 05
Kentucky 1826 05
1826 05
Kentucky 05
United States House of Representatives 05
United States House of Representatives 1826 05
November 1826 events